Anton Fase (born 6 February 2000) is a Dutch professional footballer who plays as forward.

Club career
He made his Eerste Divisie debut for Jong AZ on 1 September 2017 in a game against Jong FC Utrecht, coming on as a late substitute for Abdel Malek El Hasnaoui. In total, he only made seven appearances and one goal for Jong AZ for three seasons, partly due to an upper leg injury that kept him out of circulation for most of the 2019–20 season.

Fase signed a one-year contract with NEC in July 2020, with an option for an additional year. He made his debut for the club on 11 September in a 2–1 win over Jong Ajax, coming on for Ole Romeny after 69 minutes. In November 2021, Fase moved to Bulgarian club Botev Vratsa, signing a two-year contract. On 1 May 2022, it was confirmed that he had departed the team by mutual consent.

On 23 July was announced about new player in FK Kauno Žalgiris.

Personal life
Born in the Netherlands, Fase is of Surinamese descent.

References

External links
 

2000 births
Living people
Dutch footballers
Dutch sportspeople of Surinamese descent
Eerste Divisie players
Jong AZ players
NEC Nijmegen players
Association football forwards
AZ Alkmaar players
HFC EDO players
Footballers from Haarlem